ShoTime may refer to:
 nickname of Sho Nakata (born 1989), Japanese baseball player
 nickname of Shohei Ohtani (born 1994), Japanese baseball player

See also
Showtime (disambiguation)

Nicknames in baseball